South Malabar Gramin Bank Malappuram Kottakunnu (now Kerala Gramin Bank) was a Regional Rural Bank in India, and had its headquarters at Malappuram in Kerala. Its area of operation was limited to 8 districts in Kerala, India. It had been financing farm & non-farm sectors and other employment generation programs through its 506 branches spread over these 8 districts.

As per Government of India notification dated 08.07.2013, amalgamation of South Malabar Gramin Bank and North Malabar Gramin Bank sponsored by Syndicate Bank had been effected into a single entity as Kerala Gramin Bank with its head office at Malappuram and sponsor bank as Canara Bank after consulting NABARD, concerned sponsor banks and State government of Kerala. Government of India notification is effective from 08.07.2013

See also 

 Chelembra Bank Robbery
 Kerala Bank

References

 SMGB HomePage
 Branch Details

Defunct banks of India
Banks established in 1976
Banks disestablished in 2013
1976 establishments in Kerala
Indian companies established in 1976
Indian companies disestablished in 2013
Banks based in Kerala